Avidur Rahman is an Indian politician belonging to Indian National Congress. He was elected as a member of Bihar Legislative Assembly from Araria in 2015.

References

Living people
Indian National Congress politicians
Year of birth missing (living people)
Bihar MLAs 2015–2020
Rashtriya Janata Dal politicians
Bihar MLAs 2020–2025